Thomas Nöla (born December 31, 1979) is an Irish and American artist from Boston, Massachusetts, responsible for several low-budget films and experimental pop albums.

His musical acts have toured the US and Europe and released recordings on the Portland-based Soleilmoon/Caciocavallo label, Punch Records in Italy and on his own Disques de Lapin.

Film and television

Albums

Radio

References

External links
 thomasnola.com
 Kinderbund "Kinderbund" music video

1979 births
Living people
American pop musicians